Jason Davis (October 14, 1984 – February 16, 2020) was an American actor, best known for his role as the voice of Mikey Blumberg from the animated television series Recess.

Early life and career
Davis was born in Salt Lake City, Utah, on October 14, 1984. He was the son of Turkish American immigrant and wine grower Nebil Zarif and Jewish American Nancy Davis, daughter of industrialist and billionaire Marvin Davis, and the grandson of Barbara Davis. He has two brothers: Brandon Davis and Alexander Davis and two half-sisters, Isabella and Mariella Rickel from his mother's second marriage to Ken Rickel.

Davis had a starring role on Recess, as Mikey Blumberg, from 1997 to 2001. Davis also appeared in 7th Heaven as Dwight Jefferson. He also appeared on Millionaire Matchmaker and Jessabelle.

Davis was a cast member on the fourth season of VH1's Celebrity Rehab with Dr. Drew, which documented his treatment for substance abuse.

At the time of his death, Davis was set to appear in the upcoming television series, The Two Jasons.

Legal troubles
Davis was arrested on January 28, 2011, in Newport Beach, California, for possession of a controlled substance.

Death
Davis died in Los Angeles, California, on February 16, 2020, at the age of 35. His cause of death was revealed as the effects of fentanyl; it was ruled an accident.

Filmography

References

External links

Jason Davis at Find a Grave

1984 births
2020 deaths
Accidental deaths in California
American male child actors
American male television actors
American male voice actors
American people of English-Jewish descent
American people of Turkish descent
Davis family
Jewish American male actors
Male actors from Salt Lake City
Yale School of Drama alumni
20th-century American male actors
21st-century American male actors
Drug-related deaths in California
Burials at Westwood Village Memorial Park Cemetery